Joseph Frazier Wall (July 10, 1920 in Des Moines, Iowa – October 9, 1995) was an American historian and professor of history at Grinnell College.

His biography of Andrew Carnegie won the Bancroft Prize in 1971, and he was later nominated for the Pulitzer Prize for his biography on the Du Pont family.

He graduated from Grinnell College, Harvard University, and Columbia University.

References

External links
Liane Ellison Norman, "Joseph Frazier Wall (1920-1995): Andrew Carnegie's Greatest Historian," CARNEGIE, Jan.-Feb. 1996

1920 births
1995 deaths
Writers from Des Moines, Iowa
Grinnell College faculty
20th-century American historians
American male non-fiction writers
Bancroft Prize winners
Historians from Iowa
20th-century American male writers
Grinnell College alumni
Harvard University alumni
Columbia University alumni